Danny Dunn, Time Traveler (UK title: Danny Dunn, Time Traveller) is the eighth novel in the Danny Dunn series of juvenile science fiction/adventure books written by Raymond Abrashkin and Jay Williams. The book was first published in 1963.

Plot 
Professor Bullfinch's experiment with a time travel invention is being secretly observed by Danny, Joe, and Irene.  The youngsters are startled by the appearance of a second Joe.  During the following confusion, the time travel device transports them all into the past.  Aided by Benjamin Franklin, the Professor works to return them to their present. While in the past, the youngsters explore the society of American life under British rule, only to find one of their number in danger of being marooned in the past.

Editions 
McGraw-Hill
 (Paperback, 1963, illustrated by Owen Kampen)
 (Hardback, 1963, illustrated by Owen Kampen)

MacDonald and Jane's
 (Hardback, 1965, illustrated by Dick Hart)

Archway Books
 (Paperback, 1979, #8 in their series)

Pocket Books
 (Paperback, 1983 reissue, illustrated by Owen Kampen)

References

Danny Dunn
1963 American novels
1963 children's books
1963 science fiction novels
Novels about time travel